Fukui Dam is a gravity dam located in Tokushima prefecture in Japan. The dam is used for flood control. The catchment area of the dam is 15 km2. The dam impounds about 44  ha of land when full and can store 4750 thousand cubic meters of water. The construction of the dam was started on 1972 and completed in 1995.

References

Dams in Tokushima Prefecture
1995 establishments in Japan